The following list contains the videography for Drake, including his own music videos and videos that feature him. The first video Drake ever appeared in was Jenna's music video for her single "Change You" released in 2006.

Music videos

As lead artist

Collaboration videos

Cameo appearances

As featured artist

Film

Television

See also

Drake discography

References

External links
 October's Very Own at Vimeo
 Drake at VEVO

Videographies of Canadian artists
Videography